The Commander of the Indonesian National Armed Forces (known as Panglima TNI) is the professional head and highest-ranking officer of the Indonesian National Armed Forces. Directly answerable to the president of Indonesia (the commander-in-chief), the position is held by any four-star officer who previously served as Chief of Staff of the Indonesian Army (KSAD), Chief of Staff of the Indonesian Navy (KSAL) or Chief of Staff of the Indonesian Air Force (KSAU).

As the Commander, the officeholder has direct command and control over all of the Indonesian National Armed Forces' principal operational commands such as Army Strategic Command, Kopassus, Indonesian Marine Corps, Fleet Commands, Air Ops Commands, etc. Per president's decree 66/2019, a four-star officer acting as Deputy Commander of the Indonesian National Armed Forces deputises for the Commander, but as of 2019, the office is still vacant. The name of the office has evolved over the years, with the present name being finalized once the Indonesian National Police was separated from the Armed Forces in 1999.

The present Commander is Admiral Yudo Margono, an Indonesian Navy officer, who was inaugurated by President Joko Widodo on 19 December 2022.

Responsibilities 
As per Presidential Decree no.66 of 2019, the responsibilities of the Commander of the Indonesian National Armed Forces are to:

 lead the Armed Forces
 implement the national defense policy
 exercise the military strategy & operations
 develop the doctrinal policies
 exercise Armed Forces power projection for military operation matters
 exercise Armed Forces power development and maintain operational readiness
 provide advisory to Minister of Defense on national defense policy
 provide advisory to Minister of Defense on Armed Forces' demand fulfillment and other defense components
 provide advisory to Minister of Defense on development and execution of strategic planning of national resources for national defense matters
 utilize reserve component after mobilized for military operation matters
 utilize supporting component which has been prepared for military operation matters
 exercise other roles and responsibilities entrusted to his office by the Constitution and laws of the Republic

List of Commanders

|-style="text-align:center;"
|colspan=8|Vacant  Position abolished by President Sukarno after the 17 October 1952 incident.
|-

|-style="text-align:center;"
|colspan=8|Vacant  Position abolished by President Sukarno after the 30 September Movement incident.
|-

See also
Chief of Staff of the Indonesian Army
Chief of Staff of the Indonesian Navy
Chief of Staff of the Indonesian Air Force
Chief of the Indonesian National Police

Notes

References

 
Military ranks of Indonesia
Indonesia